Alison Young may refer to:

 Alison Harvison Young, judge of the Superior Court of Justice of Ontario
 Alison Young (sailor) (born 1987), British sailor
 Alison Young (legal scholar), British legal scholar

See also
 Allison Young, a fictional character on the FOX television series Terminator: The Sarah Connor Chronicles